The Woolworth building, located at Queen Street West and Yonge Street in downtown Toronto, pre-dates the Toronto Eaton Centre.

History

Early Tenants

Built in 1895 by Curry, Baker and Company Architects, the building was once site of Elliot Thomas' Sun Tavern (1830-1850) and Agricultural Hall from 1850-1890.

The four storey building has been home to several owners:

 Philip Jamieson Clothing Company - a clothier/wholesaler/outfitter and first occupant in 1895 and remained in business shortly after Jamieson's death in 1909
 S.H. Knox and Company - American Five and dime retailer that briefly occupied it from 1910 to 1913
 F.W. Woolworth - an American retailer and longest tenant from 1913 to 1960s acquire the store when Frank and Charles Woolworth merged their store with their cousin Knox to form F.W. Woolworth

Woolworth Tenancy 1913-1990s
Woolworth's would dramatically alter the building by cladding the entire building hiding the original architecture in the late 1960s.

Later tenants
The building would be renovated in the 1990s after Woolworth's departure from the Canadian retail scene with some of the building's original design more visible.

The building was later home to several tenants including RBC bank branch, now defunct Tower Records Superstore, sports store Sport Chek (originally as Coast Mountain Sports then as Atmosphere) and gym GoodLife Fitness.

Restoration
The building's façade was restored and additional floors were added above by Zeidler Partnership Architects (and assisted by restoration firm ERA Architects) for a new tenant in 2017.

See also 
 List of oldest buildings and structures in Toronto
 List of Woolworth buildings
 Historic Woolworth's in Wilmington, Delaware

References

Buildings and structures in Toronto
F. W. Woolworth Company buildings and structures
Commercial buildings completed in 1895